State constitution may refer to:

 State constitution (Australia)
 State constitution (United States)
 the constitution of any constituent state within a federation, confederation or some other composite polity

See also
 State (disambiguation)
 Constitution (disambiguation)
 Federated state
 Confederated state